Belgrade First League is one of the fifth-tier divisions of the Serbian football league system. It is run by the Football Association of Belgrade.

Since the 2013–14 season, the league is divided into three groups (A, B, and C).

Seasons

2006–2013

2013–present

References

External links
 Football Association of Serbia
 Football Association of Belgrade

Football in Belgrade
5